Foundation Field is a 300-seat baseball stadium located in Hamilton, Ohio.  The field opened in 2002.  It hosted the Florence Freedom in 2003 while Champion Window Field was being constructed and is currently hosting the Hamilton Joes of the Great Lakes Summer Collegiate League. The field is also home to the Miami University Hamilton Harriers college baseball team.

References

Minor league baseball venues
Baseball venues in Ohio
Buildings and structures in Butler County, Ohio
2002 establishments in Ohio
Sports venues completed in 2002
College baseball venues in the United States